The 1988 Southwest Conference men's basketball tournament was held March 12–0, 1988, at Reunion Arena in Dallas, Texas. 

Number 1 seed SMU defeated 2 seed Baylor 75-64 to win their 1st championship and receive the conference's automatic bid to the 1988 NCAA tournament.

Format and seeding 
The tournament consisted of the top 8 teams playing in a single-elimination tournament.

Tournament

References 

1987–88 Southwest Conference men's basketball season
Basketball in the Dallas–Fort Worth metroplex
Southwest Conference men's basketball tournament
Southwest Conference men's basketball tournament
Southwest Conference men's basketball tournament